= Strikes and lockouts =

Strikes and lockouts may refer to:

- Lockout (industry), work stoppage initiated by an employer
- Strike action, work stoppage initiated by the employees
